was an anime production company in Japan. After Osamu Tsuchida (originally of Hōsō Dōga) left Studio Yuni (not to be confused with the anime background art company of the same name), he founded Tsuchida Production in 1976 to do animation, production, finish animation, and other contract work related to the production of anime. The company became well known after working on Captain Tsubasa in 1983. However, when the Japanese economy went into a depression in the mid-1980s, Tsuchida Production collapsed into bankruptcy in July 1986 after being unable to reimburse its investors and various toy manufacturers with which it was working. Some of the employees went on to form Studio Comet.

Projects
Projects are listed chronologically.
Dokaben (1976–1979, contracted by Nippon Animation)
Yakyūkyō no Uta (1977–1979, contracted by Nippon Animation)
Kagaku Bōkentai Tansā 5 (1979–1980, contracted by Sunrise)
Ojamanga Yamada-kun (1980–1982)
Manga Kotowaza Jiten (1980–1982)
Ganbare Gonbe (1980)
Game Center Arashi (1982, contracted by Shin-Ei Animation)
Rainbowman (1982–1983)
Sasuga no Sarutobi (1982–1984)
Manga Nihonshi (1982–1984)
Captain Tsubasa (1983–1986)
Kuroi Ame ni Utarete (1984)
Ashita Tenki ni Naare (1984–1985)
Rampoo (1984)
Chūhai Lemon Love30S (1985)
High School! Kimengumi (1985–1987, through episode 7, episodes 8-26 were done by Gallop, with all episodes after 9 being produced by Studio Comet)

Notable former employees
Hajime Watanabe 
Hideki Okamoto 
Hiroshi Ogawa 
Yoshitaka Koyama 
Shin Misawa 
Kōji Beppu (went on to Gallop) 
Tomohisa Iizuka (founder of Studio Fantasia)

References

External links
 

Japanese animation studios
Companies that have filed for bankruptcy in Japan
Defunct entertainment companies
Film production companies of Japan
Entertainment companies established in 1976
Japanese companies disestablished in 1986
Japanese companies established in 1976
Entertainment companies disestablished in 1986